is a Tokyo metropolitan park in Kōtō, Tokyo. The park includes jogging paths, playgrounds, tennis courts, a BBQ area, and spaces for events. The park is divided into two parts, north and south, connected by a pedestrian bridge. The Museum of Contemporary Art Tokyo is located in this park.

History
After Great fire of Meireki in 1657, timber yard was moved here from Central Tokyo（then Edo）.

In 1969, the Tokyo Metropolitan Government relocated its timber industries and then made the current location into a tree filled park.

Access
General admission is free. It is an 8-minute walk from Kiba Station on the Tokyo Metro Tozai Line.

See also
Parks and gardens in Tokyo

References

Parks and gardens in Tokyo
Kōtō